Raphael Michael Gabriel Fliss (October 25, 1930 – September 21, 2015) was an American prelate of the Roman Catholic Church who served as Bishop of the Diocese of Superior, in Superior, Wisconsin from 1985 to 2007.

Biography

Bishop Fliss was born in Milwaukee, Wisconsin on October 25, 1930. He received his licentiate in theology at Catholic University of America. He was ordained May 26, 1956 and served as a priest in the Roman Catholic Archdiocese of Milwaukee. He received his doctorate from Lateran University in Rome in 1965.

He became Coadjutor Bishop of Superior on November 6, 1979, and was consecrated on December 20, 1979. On June 27, 1985 he became Bishop of Superior, appointed by Pope John Paul II.

On June 28, 2007 Bishop Fliss retired. He died on September 21, 2015.

See also

 Catholic Church hierarchy
 Catholic Church in the United States
 Historical list of the Catholic bishops of the United States
 List of Catholic bishops of the United States
 Lists of patriarchs, archbishops, and bishops

References

External links
Diocese of Superior

 

1930 births
2015 deaths
Catholic University of America alumni
21st-century Roman Catholic bishops in the United States
Religious leaders from Milwaukee
American people of Polish descent
Roman Catholic Archdiocese of Milwaukee
Roman Catholic bishops of Superior
20th-century Roman Catholic bishops in the United States